Guest is the first studio album by the rock band Critters Buggin. It was released in 1994  through Stone Gossard's then new label Loosegroove. The album was reissued by Kufala Recordings in 2004.

Track listing
 "Shag" - 4:43
 "Kickstand Hog" - 6:52
 "Critters Theme" - 6:21
 "T-Ski" - 3:12
 "5/4 FTD" - 5:34
 "Fretless Nostril" - 5:51
 "Double Pot Roast Backpack" - 1:19
 "Naked Truth" - 5:48
 "Los Lobos" - 12:56

Personnel
John Bush - percussion, loops
Matt Chamberlain - drums
Brad Houser - bass
Skerik - saxophone, guitar
Prophet Omega - sampled vocals on "Shag"
Dave Palmer - keyboards on "Double Pot Roast Backpack"
Shawn Smith - vocals on "Naked Truth"
Sophia - talk on "Naked Truth"
Bruce Calder - static engineer

References

1994 debut albums
Critters Buggin albums
Albums produced by Stone Gossard
Albums produced by Matt Chamberlain